David Darling  (born 17 June 1966 in London) is a British video game developer and entrepreneur, known for co-founding Codemasters, with his brother Richard Darling, and for being involved in a long succession of top ten games over more than 30 years. He is now founder and CEO of smartphone app developer and publisher Kwalee.

Early life
Darling's father was a contact lens pioneer married to an Australian; they had 7 children. In his early life Darling lived on three continents—in the UK, in the Netherlands, in Australia, in France and in Canada—before finally settling in Crewkerne, Somerset. While in France, the family lived on a boat and travelled through the country, settling for a time in Cap d'Agde.

Darling attended 14 different schools in this time including Wadham School where he took classes in Computer Studies. His teacher, Mr. Evans, once told him to, "Stop programming games – it's a waste of time!" Darling would often stay behind after school to program, as there was only one keyboard available in the classroom. During the day he would have to use punch cards while other children had access to the sole keyboard.

Codemasters

Darling starting writing video games on a Commodore PET with his brother, Richard, in the bedroom of their home in Vancouver, British Columbia, Canada when Darling was 11 years old. This continued when the brothers moved to Crewkerne, Somerset to live with their grandparents. They then duplicated these games themselves and sold them via small advertisements in magazines such as Popular Computing Weekly. Soon they were earning more money than their father, who returned to England to manage the burgeoning business.

In 1982, when Darling was 16, they formed the company Galactic Software and supplied a succession of games to be published by Mastertronic, including The Last V8 (published under their MAD brand), one of several titles written by Darling.

Codemasters was formed in 1986 by Darling with his brother Richard and his father Jim to publish their games themselves. Initially it was housed in an industrial unit in Banbury, Oxfordshire, then moved to offices converted from the stables, barns and other outbuildings at Lower Farm House, outside Southam, Warwickshire.

Initially Codemasters concentrated on what were known as "budget" games at the £1.99 then £2.99 pricepoint for 8 bit home computers such as the Sinclair Spectrum and Commodore 64. With titles such as BMX Simulator, Rock Star Ate My Hamster and Pro Skateboard Simulator. Codemasters developed a reputation for innovation with features such as simultaneous four player gaming. They also had major success with the Dizzy series of games developed by the Oliver Twins, who later went on to found Blitz Games Studios. Within the first year of trading Codemasters was the best selling game publisher in Britain with in excess of 27% of the total market according to the Gallup charts.

In 1990 Darling co-developed the Game Genie, a game modification device for the Nintendo Entertainment System and other game consoles; this went on to become the 5th best selling toy in the United States of America in Christmas 1991.

Codemasters evolved as a game developer to produce full price games across all current platforms, sold globally. Notable successes included the Colin McRae Rally series and Operation Flashpoint.

The Darling brothers sold their interests in Codemasters in 2007.

In the Queen's birthday honours in 2008, Darling was made a Commander of the Order of the British Empire (CBE) for "services to the computer games industry".

Kwalee

In 2011, Darling founded Kwalee in Leamington Spa, Warwickshire to develop and publish smartphone applications.

In July 2012, Darling used his personal blog on the Kwalee website to say that video game consoles have become "like dinosaurs heading for extinction." He elaborates by saying he believes that Apple and Google will take over the market which was once established by the likes of Nintendo, Sony and Microsoft.

In the same month, Darling also met with Vince Cable MP to discuss the British Government's plans for business growth in Leamington Spa.

Personal life
He lives in Ashorne House, Ashorne, Warwickshire, England.

See also
 Video gaming in the United Kingdom

References

External links
 David Darling blog at Kwalee 

1966 births
British businesspeople
British video game designers
Commanders of the Order of the British Empire
Living people